Hanoi University of Pharmacy, formerly known as the Indochina Medicine School, was established by decree of the French government signed by Indochina General Governor Paul Doumer on 8 January 1902. The school was responsible for training doctors, Indochina pharmacists and research in tropical diseases.

On 29 September 1961, the Ministry of Health issued Decision No. 828/BYT/QD to split Hanoi College of Medicine - Pharmacy into two schools: the Hanoi Medical University and Hanoi University of Pharmacy. The rector and Party Committee Secretary was pharmacist Vu Cong Thuyet; vice-rector was Professor Truong Cong Quyen.

References

Universities in Hanoi